The white-naped pigeon (Columba albinucha) is a species of bird in the family Columbidae. It has a disjunct range of presence: in the mountains of Cameroon on one hand and the Albertine Rift montane forests on the other.

Its natural habitats are subtropical or tropical moist lowland forest and subtropical or tropical moist montane forest. It is threatened by habitat destruction.

Status
Although described as locally common in parts of the Democratic Republic of Congo, the white-naped pigeon is in general a scarce bird with a limited range. The chief threat it faces is the clearance of the forest habitat in which it lives, although it can survive in secondary woodland and has been reported in coffee plantations. The population trend is unknown and the International Union for Conservation of Nature has assessed its conservation status as "near threatened".

References

white-naped pigeon
Fauna of Cameroon
white-naped pigeon
white-naped pigeon
Taxonomy articles created by Polbot